Boris Kočí (born 9 October 1964) is a Czech football manager and former player who works as assistant manager for Mladá Boleslav. A midfielder, he played over 50 matches in the Czech First League between its inception in 1993 and 1996.

Career
Kočí was appointed manager of Czech National Football League side Vlašim in January 2011. The club was in second place at the time of his appointment, but finished seventh in the 2010–11 Czech 2. Liga. In June 2011, he was appointed assistant manager to Miroslav Koubek at Mladá Boleslav.

References

External links
 Profile at iDNES.cz 

1964 births
Living people
Sportspeople from Příbram
Czech footballers
Czechoslovak footballers
Association football midfielders
Czech First League players
AC Sparta Prague players
Bohemians 1905 players
FC Slovan Liberec players
1. FK Příbram players
Czech football managers
Czech National Football League managers
FK Baník Sokolov managers
FC Sellier & Bellot Vlašim managers